The giant blind snake (Rena maxima) is a species of snake in the family Leptotyphlopidae. The species is endemic to Mexico.

Geographic range
R. maxima is found in the Mexican states of Guerrero, Morelos, Oaxaca, and Puebla.

Description

Reproduction
R. maxima is oviparous. Clutch size may be as large as seven eggs.

References

Further reading
Adalsteinsson SA, Branch WR, Trape S, Vitt LJ, Hedges SB (2009). "Molecular phylogeny, classification, and biogeography of snakes of the family Leptotyphlopidae (Reptilia, Squamata)". Zootaxa 2244: 1-50. (Rena maxima, new combination).
Loveridge A (1932). "A New Worm Snake of the Genus Leptotyphlops from Guerrero, Mexico". Proc. Biol. Soc. Washington 45: 151–152. (Leptotyphlops maximus, new species).

Rena (genus)
Reptiles described in 1932